The 1976–77 Washington State Cougars men's basketball team represented Washington State University for the 1976–77 NCAA Division I men's basketball season. Led by fifth-year head coach George Raveling, the Cougars were members of the Pacific-8 Conference and played their home games on campus at the Performing Arts Coliseum in Pullman, Washington.

References

External links
Sports Reference – Washington State Cougars: 1976–77 basketball season

Washington State Cougars men's basketball seasons
Washington State Cougars
Washington State
Washington State